Operation Wunderland ("Wonderland") comprised a large-scale operation undertaken in summer 1942 by the German Kriegsmarine in the waters of the Northern Sea Route close to the Arctic Ocean. The Germans knew that many ships of the Soviet Navy had sought refuge in the Kara Sea because of the protection that its ice pack provided during 10 months of the year.

History
On 16 August 1942, —under Kommodore Wilhelm Meendsen-Bohlken—left Narvik and entered the Barents Sea.

Kara Sea
By 19 August, the German fleet rounded Cape Zhelaniya and entered the Kara Sea which was fairly free from ice during the short summer. Fog and ice floes prevented the German warships from approaching. When they arrived at the Mona Islands, the Russian ships were gone. Admiral Scheer then turned northeast and sped towards the Nordenskiöld Archipelago.

On 24 August, U-601 sank the Soviet steamer Kuybyshev (2,332 BRT). On 25 August, Admiral Scheer fell upon the Russian icebreaker  right off the northwest coast of Russky Island at the northern end of the Nordenskiöld Archipelago. After putting up resistance, Sibiryakov was sunk in an unequal battle.

Admiral Scheer headed back to the Mona Islands, but not finding any ships, sailed again to the Nordenskiöld Archipelago, trying to straddle the two convoy routes from the Vilkitsky Strait. Since it was unable to find any Soviet ships, Admiral Scheer headed southeast towards Dikson Island in order to attack its military installations. Its powerful guns caused random destruction ashore at Dikson and badly damaged the ships  and Revolutsioner anchored in the harbour. On 30 August, Admiral Scheer returned to Narvik.

On 8 September, U-251 surfaced close to Uyedineniya Island and destroyed a Soviet weather station with gunfire.

Barents Sea
During the operation,  sank, on 17 August, a transport convoy of the Soviet Secret Service (NKVD) composed of cargo ships Nord and Komsomolets and light vessels Sh-III and P-IV west of the Yugorsky Strait. Apparently there were 328 political prisoners on board, of which 305 men were killed through artillery fire or drowning.

Conclusion
Operation Wunderland was only moderately successful. Owing to adverse weather conditions and the abundance of ice floes, the vessels taking part in Operation Wunderland did not venture beyond the Vilkitsky Strait. Therefore, the Kriegsmarine campaign only affected the Barents Sea and the Kara Sea. By mid-September it had to be stopped because of the freezing of the sea surface with thick pack-ice, especially in the Kara Sea, which not being affected by the warmer Atlantic currents freezes much earlier.

Footnotes

References

External links
 Russian Military History (in Russian)
 Military Operations in the Arctic (in Russian)
 History of the Northern Sea Route

Arctic convoys of World War II
Arctic naval operations of World War II
August 1942 events
Barents Sea
Conflicts in 1942
Kara Sea
Military operations of World War II
Naval battles of World War II involving Germany
Naval battles of World War II involving the Soviet Union
October 1942 events
September 1942 events